Clarence Dock was a railway station on the Liverpool Overhead Railway, adjacent to the dock of the same name.

It was opened on 6 March 1893 by the Marquis of Salisbury.

The station closed, along with the rest of the line on 30 December 1956. No trace of this station remains.

References

External links
 Clarence Dock station on Subterranea Britannica

Disused railway stations in Liverpool
Former Liverpool Overhead Railway stations
Railway stations in Great Britain opened in 1893
Railway stations in Great Britain closed in 1956